Cladium procerum, known commonly as the leafy twigrush, is a species of flowering plant in the sedge family. It is found mostly in swampland and on the margins of lakes. It was described by Stanley Thatcher Blake in 1943.

References

procerum
Flora of Australia
Plants described in 1943